Lonimavla Dam, is an earth-fill dam in Lonimawala village in Parner taluka of Ahmednagar district of state of Maharashtra in India.

Specifications

Purpose
 Irrigation
 Drinking water for neatest villages

See also
 Dams in Maharashtra

References

Dams in Ahmednagar district
Dams completed in 1981
Earth-filled dams
1981 establishments in Maharashtra